The 1998 Dwars door België was the 53rd edition of the Dwars door Vlaanderen cycle race and was held on 25 March 1998. The race started and finished in Waregem. The race was won by Tom Steels.

General classification

References

1998
1998 in road cycling
1998 in Belgian sport
March 1998 sports events in Europe